This is a list of the most valuable association football clubs in the Americas as ranked by Fox Sports and Forbes Mexico, and their worth in U.S. dollars.

2022 rankings

According to Forbes from Feb 2, 2023

2020 rankings

According to Forbes Mexico, as of 22 February 2021

MLS team valuations according to Sportico, as of 14 July 2021

Historical rankings

2018 rankings

According to Forbes Mexico, as of 26 July 2018

2016 rankings

According to Fox Sports, as of 29 December 2016

See also
 Forbes' list of the most valuable football clubs
 List of professional sports leagues by revenue

References

Valuable football clubs in the Americas
Valuable football clubs in the Americas